The WSA World Tour 2012 is the international squash tour and organized circuit, organized by the Women's Squash Association (WSA) for the 2012 squash season. The most important tournament in the series is the World Open held in Cayman Island. The tour features three categories of regular events, the World Series, which features the highest prize money and the best fields, Gold and Silver tournaments. The Tour is concluded by the WSA World Series Finals, the end of season championship for the top 8 rated players.

2012 Calendar
The Women's Squash Association organises the WSA World Tour, the female equivalent of the PSA World Tour Listed below are the most important events on the tour.

World Open

World Series

Gold 50

Silver 35

Silver 25

Year end world top 10 players

Retirements
Following is a list of notable players (winners of a main tour title, and/or part of the WSA World Rankings top 30 for at least one month) who announced their retirement from professional squash, became inactive, or were permanently banned from playing, during the 2012 season:

 Tania Bailey (born 2 October 1979 in the Stamford, England) joined the pro tour in 1998, reached the singles no. 4 spot in March 2003. She won 6 WSA World Tour titles including the Coronation London Open and reached the final of the prestigious British Open in 2002 lost against Sarah Fitz-Gerald and the final of Hong Kong Open. She retired in February 2012.
 Engy Kheirallah (born 10 March 1976 in the Alexandria, Egypt) joined the pro tour in 1999, reached the singles no. 12 spot in October 2006. She won 5 WSA World Tour titles including the Alexandria Sporting Club Open in 2005. She retired in January 2012 after competing of the World Open 2011.

See also
PSA World Tour 2012
WSA World Series
2012 Women's World Team Squash Championships
Official Women's Squash World Ranking
Women's Squash Association

References

External links
 WSA website

WSA World Tour seasons
2012 in squash